Afossochiton is an extinct genus of polyplacophoran molluscs. Afossochiton became extinct during the Pliocene period.

References 

Paleogene molluscs
Prehistoric chiton genera
Neogene molluscs
Oligocene genus first appearances
Pliocene genus extinctions